Brittany Grace Lincicome (born September 19, 1985) is an American professional golfer who plays on the LPGA Tour. She currently resides in Gulfport, Florida.

Lincicome is one of the longest drivers in women's golf. Her prodigious length off the tee has earned her the nickname "Bam-Bam." Lincicome has won two major championships: the 2009 Kraft Nabisco Championship and the 2015 ANA Inspiration.

Amateur career
Lincicome was born in St. Petersburg, Florida, and participated in more than 100 amateur events. Her wins included the American Junior Golf Association Chateu Elan in 2001 and 2003 and the Avilla Junior Classic in 2003. In 2004, she won the Harder Hall Invitational. Lincicome competed in both the 2004 U.S. Women's Open and the 2004 State Farm Classic on the LPGA Tour as an amateur, even leading the former after the first round.

Professional career
Lincicome turned professional in December 2004 at age 19, after finishing in 20th place at the LPGA Final Qualifying Tournament to earn her tour card for 2005.  Home-schooled, she had graduated from high school the previous spring.  Her first victory was in the 2006 HSBC Women's World Match Play Championship, where she defeated Michelle Wie in the quarterfinals, Lorena Ochoa in the semifinals, and Juli Inkster in the final match. She captured her second win in April 2007 at the Ginn Open, again holding off Ochoa to capture the victory on the 72nd hole.

In 2007, Lincicome earned a spot on the U.S. Solheim Cup team for the first time. In singles play, she lost to Laura Davies. Years earlier, as a 12-year-old, Lincicome had carried the scoring sign for Davies at the JCPenney Classic LPGA event, leading Davies to good-naturedly refer to Lincicome as "Sign Girl."

In 2009, Lincicome won the Kraft Nabisco Championship, an LPGA major, after making an eagle on the final hole to leap frog Kristy McPherson, who held a one shot lead going into the final hole.

In August 2014, Lincicome lost a sudden-death playoff with Inbee Park at the LPGA Championship. She had held a one shot lead coming to the 72nd hole, but made bogey to fall back into a playoff. Lincicome lost the playoff at the first extra hole when she could only make a bogey to Park's par.

Lincicome won her second major championship in April 2015, with a victory at the ANA Inspiration, the second time she had won this major. She moved into a tie for the lead after eagling the 72nd hole in regulation play, just as she had done when winning the title in 2009.  Lincicome prevailed in a sudden-death playoff over fellow American Stacy Lewis, winning with a par on the third extra hole.

In 2018, Lincicome was granted a sponsor's exemption into the Barbasol Championship on the PGA Tour. This made her the fifth woman to play in a PGA Tour sanctioned event, the first since Michelle Wie in 2008. Lincicome missed the cut by 9 shots, scoring 78 (+6) and 71 (−1), her second round making her the second woman to break par on a PGA Tour event.

Professional wins (8)

LPGA Tour wins (8)

LPGA Tour playoff record (2–5)

Major championships

Wins (2)

1 Defeated Stacy Lewis in a sudden-death playoff: Lincicome (5-5-5) and Lewis (5-5-6).

Results timeline
Results not in chronological order before 2019 or in 2020.

^ The Evian Championship was added as a major in 2013

CUT = missed the half-way cut
NT = no tournament
T = tied

Summary

Most consecutive cuts made – 10 (2009 U.S. Open – 2011 British Open)
Longest streak of top-10s – 4 (2014 WPC – 2015 WPC)

LPGA Tour career summary

 Official through 2022 season.
* Includes matchplay and other events without a cut.

Team appearances
Amateur
Junior Solheim Cup (representing the United States): 2002 (winners), 2003

Professional
Solheim Cup (representing the United States): 2007 (winners), 2009 (winners), 2011, 2013, 2015 (winners), 2017 (winners)
Lexus Cup (representing International team): 2006, 2007

Solheim Cup record

References

External links

American female golfers
LPGA Tour golfers
Winners of LPGA major golf championships
Solheim Cup competitors for the United States
Golfers from Florida
Sportspeople from St. Petersburg, Florida
People from Seminole, Florida
1985 births
Living people
21st-century American women